Wellingborough Aggregates Terminal is a rail freight terminal in Wellingborough, UK. It is operated by GRS Rail Services.

In 2022, the terminal was the site of an electrification trial. As freight trains are usually loaded from above, it is not possible to install typical overhead lines. A new moveable overhead conductor was installed which retracts to allow loading of the train.

References 

UK Railways articles by quality